La Quarantaine is a novel written in French by French Nobel laureate writer J. M. G. Le Clézio .

Plot summary

Publication history

First French edition

References

Novels by J. M. G. Le Clézio
1995 French novels
Works by J. M. G. Le Clézio
Éditions Gallimard books